Newland Halt railway station was a station in Newland, Worcestershire, England. The station was opened on 18 March 1929 and closed on 5 April 1965.

References

Further reading

Disused railway stations in Worcestershire
Railway stations in Great Britain opened in 1929
Railway stations in Great Britain closed in 1965
Former Great Western Railway stations
Beeching closures in England